The Niagara Falls Citizens were a minor league baseball club, based in Niagara Falls, New York. The franchise can be traced back to 1939 when the Niagara Falls Rainbows were established and played as a charter member of the Pennsylvania–Ontario–New York League. The team was affiliated with the Cleveland Indians in 1939. However, on July 13, 1940, the team relocated to Jamestown, New York to become the Jamestown Falcons.

Niagara Falls went without a team until 1946, when the Niagara Falls Frontiers were established. The team played in the Middle Atlantic League as an affiliate of the Philadelphia Athletics in 1946 and 1947. However the team disbanded after a first-round playoff loss in 1947. Finally, the city fielded the Niagara Falls Citizens in 1950 to continue play in the Middle Atlantic League. In 1951 the Citizens won the league's final title, before disbanding.

Each of the Niagara Falls teams played their home games at Sal Maglie Stadium.

Year-by-year record

Notable alumni

 Sal Maglie (1940) 2 x MLB All-Star; 1950 NL ERA Leader

References
Falls&state=NY&country=US&empty=0 Baseball Reference Niagara Falls, New York

Baseball teams established in 1939
Sports clubs disestablished in 1951
Defunct minor league baseball teams
Cleveland Guardians minor league affiliates
Philadelphia Athletics minor league affiliates
1939 establishments in New York (state)
1951 disestablishments in New York (state)
Defunct baseball teams in New York (state)
Middle Atlantic League teams
Baseball teams disestablished in 1951